The alto flute is an instrument in the Western concert flute family, the second-highest member below the standard C flute after the uncommon flûte d'amour. It is the third most common member of its family after the standard C flute and the piccolo. It is characterized by its rich, mellow tone in the lower portion of its range. It uses the same fingerings as the C flute and piccolo, but is a transposing instrument in G (sounding a perfect fourth lower than written).

The bore of the alto flute is considerably larger in diameter and longer than a C flute and requires more breath from the player. This gives it a greater dynamic presence in the bottom octave and a half of its range.

It was the favourite flute variety of Theobald Boehm, who perfected its design.

Its range is from G3 (the G below middle C) to G6 (4 ledger lines above the treble clef staff) plus an altissimo register stretching to D7. The headjoint may be straight or curved.

British music that uses this instrument often refers to it as a bass flute, which can be confusing since there is a distinct instrument known by that name. This naming confusion originated in the fact that the modern flute in C is pitched in the same range as the Renaissance tenor flute; therefore, a lower pitched instrument would be called a bass.

Headjoint shape

Alto flute headjoints are built in 'curved' and 'straight' versions. The curved headjoint is frequently preferred by smaller players because it requires less of a stretch for the arms, and makes the instrument feel lighter by moving the center of gravity nearer to the player. However, the straight version is more commonly used for better overall intonation.

The embouchure for alto flute is similar to that for C flute, but in proportion to the size of the instrument. Hence the embouchure-hole sits lower on the lower lip, and the lip-aperture is wider.

Repertoire
The following lists are not intended to be complete, but rather to present a representative sampling of the most commonly played and well-known works in the genre. The lists also do not generally include works originally written for other instruments and subsequently transcribed, adapted, or arranged for alto flute, unless such piece is very common in the repertory, in which case it is listed with its original instrumentation noted.

Alto flute alone
 Bruno Bartolozzi: Cantilena
 Garth Baxter: Variations on the Willow Tree
 Jonathan Bayley: Music for Pan (1982)
 Michael Csany-Wills: Trystyng
 Charles Delaney: Variations on the 'Seeds of Love''' (1989)
 Jon Gibson: Untitled (1974)
 Alexander Goehr: Ariel Sing (2003)
 Philippe Hersant: Cinq Miniatures (1995)
 Daniel Kessner: A Serene Music (2012)
 Coreen Morsink: Andromache (2010)
 Patrick Nunn: Maqamat (2002)
 Michael Oliva: Les Heures Bleues (2013)
 Edwin Roxburgh: The Curlew (1994)
 Kaija Saariaho: Couleurs du vent (1998)
 Alexander Shchetynsky: Five Etudes (2011)
 Harvey Sollberger: Hara Karlheinz Stockhausen:Susani's Echo, 3. ex Nr.  (1985)Xi, 3. ex Nr. 55 (1986)
 David Bennett Thomas: Carla (2012)
 Guillem Ponsí: Alnilam (2020)

Alto flute and piano
 Arnold Cooke: Sonatina for Alto Flute and Piano (1985)
 Tom Febonio: Sonata for Alto Flute and Piano
 Daniel Kessner: Simple Motion (1993)
 Melvin Lauf: Passing Thoughts Phyllis Louke: As The Clouds Parted Andrew McBirnie: The Moon by Night (2003)
 Mike Mower: Sonnets Laura Pettigrew: OffertoireGary Schocker: Sonata for a Lost PlanetAlto flute, piano and electronics
 John Palmer: AfterglowOrchestral excerpts
In the classical literature, the alto flute is particularly associated with the scores of Igor Stravinsky and Maurice Ravel, both of whom used the instrument's distinctive tone color in a variety of scores. It is featured in Ravel's Daphnis et Chloé, Stravinsky's The Rite of Spring, Franco Alfano's opera Cyrano de Bergerac, Sergei Prokofiev's Scythian Suite and the original version of Webern's Six Pieces for Orchestra. Shostakovich used it in his operas The Gamblers (left unfinished), Lady Macbeth of the Mtsensk District (also known as Katerina Ismailova), as well as in his Symphony No. 7 (Leningrad). It also figures prominently in several movements of Gustav Holst's The Planets. It also appears in Howard Shore's music for The Lord of the Rings among many other contemporary film scores. Even before 1940 it had been used occasionally in Hollywood; early Broadway pit orchestrations using the instrument include Jerome Kern's Music in the Air (1932) and Very Warm for May'' (1939), both scored by Robert Russell Bennett (the manuscript orchestrations are in the Jerome Kern Collection, Music Division, The Library of Congress).

Performers
A number of specialist alto flute players have emerged in recent years. These include French improvisor/composer Christian Le Delezir, American Christine Potter, British Kingma System alto flute player Carla Rees, jazz players Ali Ryerson and Brian Landrus, American Peter Sheridan who currently resides in Australia, Swiss composers/performers Matthias Ziegler and Stefan Keller and Dutch composer/performer Anne La Berge. Florian Schneider-Esleben of the German Electronic Group, Kraftwerk, played an alto flute in the first few years of the band's tenure.

References

Side-blown flutes
G instruments